Giuseppe Tartaggia (born 15 June 1971) is an Italian racing cyclist. He rode in the 1997 Tour de France.

References

External links
 

1971 births
Living people
Italian male cyclists
Place of birth missing (living people)
People from Arona, Piedmont
Sportspeople from the Province of Novara
Cyclists from Piedmont